The Beatnuts is the self-titled full-length debut album by American hip hop trio The Beatnuts. It was released on June 21, 1994, via Violator/Relativity Records. Recording sessions took place at LGK Studios in Leonia, New Jersey, at Soundtrack Studios and Greene St. Recording in New York. Production was handled by the Beatnuts, except for one song produced by Lucien. It features guest appearances from Gab Gotcha of Triflicts, Grand Puba and Miss Jones. The album reached number 182 on the Billboard 200 and number 28 on the Top R&B/Hip Hop Albums in the United States. It boasts two singles: "Props Over Here", which peaked at number 39 on the US Hot Rap Singles, and "Hit Me with That". Music video for "Props Over Here" was directed by Abraham Lincoln Lim.

The album's title is sometimes mistakenly referred to as Street Level, because those words appear on the album cover; however, the words "Street Level" do not appear anywhere else on the CD (in the liner notes or on the CD spine label). Its cover art was inspired by the cover of Hank Mobley's The Turnaround!. The song "Psycho Dwarf" previously appeared on the 1993 Intoxicated Demons: The EP. It is the last Beatnuts album to include Fashion, who left the group to pursue a solo career under the alias Al' Tariq.

In 2012, the album was listed at No. 23 on Complex magazine's 'The 50 Greatest Debut Albums in Hip-Hop History'. In 2014, the album was placed at No. 19 on the Vibe magazine's 'The 50 Best Rap Albums Of 1994' list.

Track listing

Personnel

Lester "Psycho Les" Fernandez – vocals, producer
Jerry "JuJu" Tineo – vocals, producer
Berntony "Fashion" Smalls – vocals
Victor "V.I.C." Padilla – producer
Lenny Underwood – keyboards (track 3)
Joel "Mista Sinista" Wright – additional scratches (track 5), scratches (track 6)
Maxwell "Grand Puba" Dixon – vocals (track 5)
Tarsha Nicole Jones – vocals (track 9)
Gabriel "Gab Gotcha" Velasquez – vocals (track 14)
Lucien M'Baïdem – producer (track 2)
Troy Hightower – recording, mixing
Kirk Yano – recording, mixing
Rich Keller – recording
Andy Blakelock – assistant recording & mixing engineer
Chris Curran – assistant recording & mixing engineer
Matt Tuffi – assistant recording & mixing engineer
Danny Madorsky – assistant recording engineer
Emerson Mykoo – assistant recording engineer
Djinji Brown – assistant recording engineer
Steve Souder – assistant mixing engineer
Jack Hersca – assistant mixing engineer
Chris Gehringer – mastering
Chris Lighty – executive producer
Peter Kang – executive producer
David Bett – art direction
Danny Clinch – photography

Charts

References

External links

1994 debut albums
The Beatnuts albums
Relativity Records albums
Albums produced by the Beatnuts
Albums recorded at Greene St. Recording